First Lieutenant Mohammad Zgheib ( Moulazem Awal Mohamed Zughai'b) was a Lebanese officer killed in the Battle of Malkia during the 1948 Arab-Israeli War. Highly regarded as a heroic figure in the Lebanese resistance history and in the accomplishments of the Lebanese army. Maarouf Saad fought under his command, and many other fine soldiery combatants.  In honouring his memory, the headquarters of the Lebanese Armed Forces South region command, Mohammad Zgheib military base, was named after him.

Lebanese military personnel
Lebanese Shia Muslims
1948 deaths
Year of birth missing
Military personnel killed in action